The 2021 Arab Cup U-20 was the fifth edition of the Arab Cup U-20. It was hosted by Egypt from 20 June to 6 July 2021. The tournament included 12 UAFA-member teams and four invited teams. Senegal were the defending champions but were eliminated in the quarter-finals. Saudi Arabia beat Algeria 2–1 in the final to win their first title.

Teams

Draw 
The draw took place on 29 May 2021. The 16 teams were drawn into four groups of four. The match schedule was unveiled on 6 June 2021.

The draw mechanism was in accordance with the seeding of the teams, as follows:

Venues 

The 30 June Stadium was later included as a venue for the Group D matches due to the poor condition of Police Academy Stadium.

Match officials 
The following 31 referees were chosen for the tournament.

Squads 
Players born on or after 1 January 2001 were eligible to compete.

Group stage
The top two teams of each group advanced to the quarter-finals.

All times are local, CAT (UTC+2).

Group A

Group B

Group C

Group D

Knockout phase 
In the knockout stage, penalty shoot-out was used to decide the winner if necessary (no extra time was played).

Bracket

Quarter-finals

Semi-finals

Final 
The final match was initially scheduled to be played at the Cairo International Stadium at 20:00. The UAFA decided to play the game at 17:00 at the 30 June Stadium, also in Cairo.

Statistics

Goalscorers

See also 
2021 Arab Cup U-17
2021 Arab Women's Cup

References 

Arab Cup U-20
Arab
Arab
Arab
Arab
Arab
Arab
Arab